NGC 98 is a barred spiral galaxy in the Phoenix constellation. The galaxy NGC 98 was discovered on September 6, 1834 by the British astronomer John Frederick William Herschel.

External links 
 SEDS

References 

Barred spiral galaxies
Phoenix (constellation)
Astronomical objects discovered in 1843
0098
Discoveries by John Herschel